Berik Kupeshov (born 30 January 1987) is a Kazakhstani road bicycle racer who formerly rode for UCI ProTeam .

Major results

2004
 , Asian Junior Games, Scratch
2005
 , Asian Junior Games, Pursuit

External links

Kazakhstani male cyclists
1987 births
Living people
Cyclists at the 2006 Asian Games
Cyclists at the 2010 Asian Games
Asian Games competitors for Kazakhstan
20th-century Kazakhstani people
21st-century Kazakhstani people